Peter Curtis Bunnell (October 25, 1937 – September 20, 2021) was an American author, scholar and historian of photography. For more than 40 years he had a significant impact on collecting, exhibiting, teaching and practicing photography through his work as a university professor, museum curator and prolific author.

Early life and education
Peter Curtis Bunnell was born on October 25, 1937, in Poughkeepsie, New York. He received an undergraduate degree from the Rochester Institute of Technology, where he studied with photographer Minor White, and an M.F.A. from Ohio University, where he studied with Clarence H. White Jr., the son of the pictorial photographer Clarence Hudson White. He then went on to receive an M.A. degree in art history from Yale University, and later become an associate in the Alfred Stieglitz Archive at the university.

Life and career

Bunnell joined the Museum of Modern Art staff in New York in 1966, on a temporary assignment to review and catalogue its collection of photographs, and in 1968 became Associate Curator of the Department of Photography. In 1970 he was named the Curator of the Department of Photography at the Museum. Two years later he was invited to teach at Princeton University and was given the position of David Hunter McAlpin Professor of the History of Photography and Modern Art. This was the first endowed professorship in the history of photography in the United States. That same year he curated a show at the museum called Photography into Sculpture, the first comprehensive survey of photographically formed images used in a sculptural manner. The show has been called "one of the great contributions to the history of photography" due to its intent to redefine photography in a new spatial concept.

From 1973 to 1978 Bunnell was also the Director of the Princeton University Art Museum, where he helped build the collection of photographic holdings into "one of the great North American teaching collections." He later served as Curator of the Minor White Archive and as Curator of Photography at Princeton University Art Museum.

In 1979 he was awarded a Guggenheim Foundation Fellowship for further study of the history of photography. Bunnell received a fellowship from the Asian Cultural Council in 1984 that enabled him to travel and lecture extensively in Japan. He returned briefly to Japan in 1995 as a consultant to the National Museum of Modern Art, Tokyo. He later taught at New York University, Dartmouth College, Yale University and the University of Florida.

In 2002, Bunnell retired from his post at Princeton. That same year the U.S. Postal Service issued a set of postage stamps called Masters of American Photography featuring photographers and images selected by Bunnell.

In 2011, Princeton University announced the endowment of the Peter C. Bunnell Curatorship in Photography.

In April 2019, Bunnell donated about 110 archival boxes of materials from his personal archive (Peter C. Bunnell Papers) to the Manuscripts Division of the Princeton University Library. The papers donated to the Library complemented a separate gift to the Princeton University Art Museum of more than 30 years of his correspondence and other materials relating to its Minor White and Clarence H. White archival collections.

Death
Bunnell died on September 20, 2021, in Princeton, New Jersey, following a lengthy illness. He was 83.

Publications

Jerry N. Uelsmann: An Aperture Monograph (1970) 
Barbara Morgan (1972)  
Nonsilver Printing Processes: Four Selections 1886–1927 (1973) 
Harry Callahan (1978) 
Altered Landscapes: The Photographs of John Pfahl (1981) 
Edward Weston on Photography (1983) 
Clarence H. White: The Reverence for Beauty (1986) 
Minor White: The Eye That Shapes (1989) 
A Photographic Vision: Pictorial Photography 1889-1923 (1980) 
Emmet Gowin: Photographs 1966–1983 (1983) 
EW:100. Centennial Essays in Honor of Edward Weston (1986) 
Light Years: The Friends of Photography 1967-1985 (1987) 
Alfred Stieglitz: Photographs from the Collection of Georgia O’Keeffe (1993) ISBN
Degrees of Guidance: Essays on Twentieth-Century American Photography (1993) 
Ruth Bernhard: The Collection of Ginny Williams (1993) 
Photography at Princeton: Celebrating Twenty-Five Years of Collecting and Teaching the History of Photography (1998) 
Edward Ranney Photographs: The John B. Elliott Collection (2003) 
Michael Kenna: A Twenty Year Retrospective (2003) 
Inside the Photograph: Writings on Twentieth-Century Photography (2006) 
Eye Mind Spirit: The Enduring Legacy of Minor White (2009) 
Walter Chappell: Eternal Impermanence (2013)

Exhibitions curated

References

1937 births
2021 deaths
Writers from Poughkeepsie, New York
Yale Graduate School of Arts and Sciences alumni
Ohio University alumni
Princeton University faculty
Historians of photography
American art curators
Directors of museums in the United States
Photography academics
Photography critics
Photography curators